"Let's Give Adam and Eve Another Chance" is a song written by Red West and Richard Mainegra. It was recorded by Gary Puckett & The Union Gap for their 1970 album, Gary Puckett & The Union Gap's Greatest Hits. The song reached #41 on The Billboard Hot 100 in 1970 and #16 on the Adult Contemporary chart.

This was the last charting single for the band. Bandmates Kerry Chater and Gary Withem left the band shortly after the song's release due to management of the band demanding they receive weekly salaries instead of a percentage of the band's revenues.

References

1970 singles
1970 songs
Songs written by Red West
Gary Puckett & The Union Gap songs
Columbia Records singles
Songs written by Richard Mainegra
Song recordings produced by Dick Glasser